Frank Richardson may refer to:

Frank Richardson (Australian footballer) (1897–1970), Australian footballer
Frank Richardson (director) (1898–1962), Anglo-American film director
Frank Richardson (footballer, born 1897) (1897–1987), English footballer
Frank Richardson (police officer) (1851–1938), member of the British Constabulary in Birmingham
Frank Richardson (runner) (born 1955), American marathon runner
Frank Richardson (swimmer) (born 1962), Nicaraguan Olympic swimmer
Frank K. Richardson (1914–1999), associate justice of the California Supreme Court

See also
Francis Richardson (1815–1896), merchant
Francis Northey Richardson (1894–1983), British brewer